Michael Stars is a Los Angeles-based apparel and lifestyle retail company that offers women and men’s fashion, including t-shirts, bottoms, dresses, sweaters, jackets, and accessories. This brand specializes in t-shirts, which have been for sale for many years. The company was founded by the married couple Michael Cohen and Suzanne Lerner.

History

The History Behind the Brand

Co-founder Michael Cohen began his career in the apparel industry in his native South Africa, where at the age of 21 he founded the import-export fashion agency Bernstein & Cohen. In 1977, he moved to Los Angeles where he would later meet co-founder Suzanne Lerner. At the time, Lerner was running Lerner et Cie, a wholesale fashion showroom she founded in 1983. Cohen was working with contemporary artist John Stars, placing his designs on t-shirts. Cohen approached Lerner about representing the brand, and in 1986, the two of them launched Michael Stars. Two years later, Cohen and Lerner were married.

In the beginning, Michael Stars focused on unisex, one-size-fits-all t-shirts. The original designs were boxy and decorated in bright colors and interwoven, French-inspired graphics. The brand is recognized as one of the first to start changing the body of the t-shirt, using fitted shapes, cap-sleeves and various silhouettes. The company gained note from various shows, specifically being featured on Beverly Hills, 90210. At the time the shirts were sold at upscale retailers such as Barneys, Fred Segal and Harrods.

Lifestyle brand
Over the next two decades, Michael Stars evolved from a t-shirt company to a luxury lifestyle brand, expanding its line to include more generic fashion staples like dresses, leather and cashmere sweaters.  In July 2013, it launched its first full women’s fashion collection with 160 pieces.  In September 2014, the brand added its first ever men’s line, a collection of 34 basics with “a modern, technical edge.” The collection marks the first time the brand has included menswear since its early days of unisex tees.

The label is sold at its branded retail stores, department stores, including Bloomingdale's and Neiman Marcus, and at about a thousand specialty stores across the US. In May 2014, the company introduced its Curbside Boutique, a 16-foot truck refurbished as a boutique on wheels. The mobile store first toured New York City before moving to Southern California. The brand currently has twelve retail store locations, including its flagship store in West Hollywood. The company continues to make its entire t-shirt and activewear line in Los Angeles.

Today the brand maintains a wide customer range, including celebrities such as Jessica Alba, Sarah Jessica Parker, Olivia Wilde, Maria Bello, Halle Berry, January Jones, Emmy Rossum and Jessica Biel, and is regularly featured in magazines like Vogue, Harper’s Bazaar, Lucky, Elle and InStyle.

In January 2015, after nearly thirty years as President, Michael Cohen stepped down as the head of the company. In March 2015, he died from prostate cancer. Suzanne Lerner is the current President.

Charity work
Cohen and Lerner formed the Michael Stars Foundation in 2005. The foundation is a regular supporter of numerous philanthropic events and charities, including The Joyful Heart Foundation, We Advance, Children Mending Hearts, Ms. Foundation, and Women Thrive Worldwide, among others. Over the years the brand has also created shirts to benefit organizations such as UNICEF, Hurricane Katrina, and the American Heart Association. In April 2015, the company  launched the Artisan Collection, a collaboration with Paula Coles designed to help support local Haitian artisans as well as education in Haiti through Prodev schools.

References

Retail companies of the United States
Companies based in Los Angeles
American companies established in 1986
Retail companies established in 1986